The Saint Seiya video game series are based on the manga and anime series of the same name created by Masami Kurumada. The games are of various genres, mostly fighting games and beat 'em ups, with occasional elements of role-playing games and platform games. Other genres include educational games and card battle games.

Several video games have been released based on the series. Most video games refer mainly to the classic series from 1986.

Since 1987, many video games based on the property have been released in Japan, with the majority being published by Bandai. Most of the releases remained Japan-exclusive until 2005, with the exception of the first title in the series, Saint Seiya: Ōgon Densetsu, which was also released in France. Recent games in the series were also made available in Australia, South Korea, Brazil and parts of South America and Europe. In 2013, a title in the series was released in North America for the first time.

Characters from Saint Seiya have appeared in a number of games published by Bandai and Bandai Namco Entertainment including Famicom Jump: Hero Retsuden (1988), Jump! Ultimate Stars (2006), J-Stars Victory VS (2014) and Jump Force (2019).

Main series
Most video games refer mainly to the classic series Saint Seiya from 1986/1990:

Mobile games
All of these video games are based on the 1986 classic series of Saint Seiya:

 Saint Seiya Cosmo Slottle, released on January 10, 2014 by Namco Bandai for iOS platforms only in Japan, and later released for Android compatible devices. The events are based on the classic series, and the game offers slot-machine and pachinko gameplay. The plot covers the Galaxian Wars arc and the Twelve Temples arc as interpreted by the anime adaptation.
 Saint Seiya: Big Bang Cosmo, a trading card game released on April 1, 2014 for Yahoo's and DeNA's mobile phone game portal, Mobage. Support for the game ended in 2017.
 Saint Seiya: Cosmo Fantasy – Knights of the Zodiac, an action role-playing game initially released on January 29, 2016 for Android and iOS devices in Japan as Saint Seiya: Zodiac Brave. The game features characters from the classic manga series and was released worldwide in English in 2017. Support ended after July 28, 2022.
 Saint Seiya: Galaxy Spirits, an action role-playing game, originally released in 2016 and released globally on May 13, 2019 for Android devices.
 Saint Seiya: Awakening (originally released as Saint Seiya Tencent in 2017), a role-playing game released globally in June 2019.
 Saint Seiya: Shining Soldiers, a fighting game focusing on PvP battles, released in 2020. Support ended after January 2021.
 Saint Seiya: Legend of Justice, a role-playing game released in 2022 for Android and iOS devices.

Related games

Crossovers
The following games feature characters from the 1986 classic series Saint Seiya:

 Famicom Jump: Hero Retsuden (Famicom, 1988)
 Cult Jump (Game Boy, 1993; Quiz game in Japanese with questions about the original Saint Seiya manga)
 Pop'n Music Animation Melody (Arcade, PlayStation, Game Boy Color, 2000)
 Pop'n Music Animelo 2 (Arcade, 2001)
 Karaoke Revolution Anime Song Selection (PlayStation 2, 2003; "Pegasus Fantasy" is one of the songs featured in the game)
 Jump! Ultimate Stars (Nintendo DS, 2006)
 J Legend Retsuden (Nintendo 3DS, 2013; Compilation of Famicom games that includes Ougon Densetsu and Ougon Densetsu Kanketsu-hen)
 LINE Rangers (Android, 2014; Four Bronze Saints and two Gold Saints appeared for a limited time in February 2018)
 J-Stars Victory VS (PlayStation 3, PlayStation Vita, 2014)
 Jumputi Heroes (Android, iOS, 2014)
 Puzzle & Dragons (Android, iOS, 2014; Pegasus Seiya, Dragon Shiryu, Cygnus Hyoga, Andromeda Shun, and Phoenix Ikki were added in a collaboration to promote the release of the film Saint Seiya: Legend of Sanctuary)
 J-Stars Victory VS+ (PlayStation 3, PlayStation Vita, PlayStation 4, 2015)
 Mobile Legends: Bang Bang (Android, iOS, 2016; A MLBB × Saint Seiya collaboration in October 2022 featured a number of Gold Cloths and Bronze Cloths)
 Monster Strike (Android, 2016; Featured Saint Seiya characters during the collaboration event Saint Seiya × Monster Strike)
 Weekly Shōnen Jump Jikkyō Janjan Stadium (Android, iOS, 2018)
 Jump Force (Xbox One, PlayStation 4, PC, 2019)

LCD games
LCD games were released in Japan and Italy featuring characters from Saint Seiya.

 Saint Seiya: Explode, Pegasus Ryu Sei Ken (Japan, 1987)
 Saint Seiya: Sanctuary Armagedon (Japan, 1988)
 Saint Seiya: Burn! Seven Senses (Japan, 1988)
 Saint Paradise: 12 Kyū Saigo no Seisen (Japan, 1992)
 I Cavalieri dello Zodiaco: Electronic Game (Italy, 2001)
 I Cavalieri dello Zodiaco: Il Duello Decisivo (Italy, 2008)

Pachinko
Several pachinko and pachislot machines have been released featuring Saint Seiya of the 1986 themes.

 CR Saint Seiya Ōgon (2011)
 CR Saint Seiya Seidō (2011)
 CR Saint Seiya 99 Version (2012)
 Pachisuro Saint Seiya (2012)
 CR Saint Seiya: Hoshi no Unmei (2013)
 CR Saint Seiya: Hoshi no Unmei 77 Version (2014)
 CR Saint Seiya: Hoshi no Unmei 99 Version (2014)
 Pachisuro Saint Seiya Ōgon: Gekitō Hen (2014)
 Pachisuro Saint Seiya: Megami Seisen (2015)
 CR Saint Seiya: Beyond the Limit MLA (2015)
 CR Saint Seiya: Beyond the Limit XLA (2015)
 CR Saint Seiya: Beyond the Limit ZLA (2015)
 CR Saint Seiya: Beyond the Limit ZLB (2015)
 CRA Saint Seiya: Beyond the Limit 99 Version (2016)
 Pachisuro Saint Seiya: Kaikō Kakusei (2017)
 CR Saint Seiya 4: The Battle of Genkai Toppa (2018)
 Pachisuro Saint Seiya: Kaikō Kakusei Special (2019)
 PA Saint Seiya 4: The Battle of Genkai Toppa (2019)
 S Saint Seiya: Meiō Fukkatsu (2022)

Notes

References

External links
Official Bandai Namco website 

 
Saint Seiya
Video Games